The Allegheny Mountain Collegiate Conference (AMCC) is an intercollegiate athletic conference affiliated with the NCAA's Division III. Member institutions are located in the northeastern United States in the states of New York and Pennsylvania.

History
The most recent changes to conference membership took place in 2020, with two full members and one associate member leaving. D'Youville College began a transition to NCAA Division II in the East Coast Conference, and Franciscan University of Steubenville completed a multi-year transition to full membership in the D-III Presidents' Athletic Conference. Wittenberg University, which became a men's volleyball associate in 2018–19, left the AMCC to return to the Midwest Collegiate Volleyball League, where it had played from the start of its program in the 2015–16 school year through 2017–18. Medaille College joined the entirely New York-based Empire 8, effective the 2022–23 school year. Wells College, current affiliate member for swimming and diving, will add men's volleyball to compete in the AMCC as an affiliate, effective the 2023 spring season (2022–23 school year). Carlow University is joining in 2023–24 from the National Association of Intercollegiate Athletics' River States Conference but is spending its exploratory year in the prior NAIA season.

Chronological timeline
 1997 - In 1997, the Allegheny Mountain Collegiate Conference (AMCC) was founded. Charter members included Frostburg State University, La Roche College (now La Roche University), Lake Erie College, Pennsylvania State University at Erie, the Behrend College (a.k.a. Penn State–Erie or Penn State–Behrend), the University of Pittsburgh at Bradford (a.k.a. Pitt–Bradford) and the University of Pittsburgh at Greensburg (a.k.a. Pitt–Greensburg), effective beginning the 1997-98 academic year.
 1998 - Pennsylvania State University at Altoona (a.k.a. Penn State–Altoona) joined the AMCC, effective in the 1998-99 academic year.
 2005 - Hilbert College and Medaille College joined the AMCC, effective in the 2005-06 academic year.
 2006 - Mount Aloysius College joined the AMCC, effective in the 2006-07 academic year.
 2008
 Lake Erie left the AMCC to join the NCAA Division II ranks of the National Collegiate Athletic Association (NCAA) as an NCAA D-II Independent (which would then later join the Great Lakes Intercollegiate Athletic Conference (GLIAC) a few seasons later, effective beginning the 2010-11 academic year), effective after the 2007-08 academic year.
 D'Youville College (now "University") joined the AMCC, effective in the 2008-09 academic year.
 2009 - Franciscan University of Steubenville joined the AMCC, effective in the 2009-10 academic year.
 2010 - Frostburg State left the AMCC to join the Capital Athletic Conference (CAC), effective after the 2009-10 academic year.
 2015 - New Jersey City University joined the AMCC as an associate member for women's bowling, effective in the 2016 spring season (2015-16 academic year).
 2017 - Hiram College joined the AMCC as an associate member for men's volleyball, effective in the 2018 spring season (2017-18 academic year).
 2018 - Five institutions joined the AMCC as associate members: Geneva College, Thiel College and Wittenberg University for men's volleyball; Saint Vincent College for women's bowling; and the State University of New York at Delhi for men's & women's swimming & diving, all effective in the 2019 spring season (2018-19 academic year).
 2019 - Alfred State College joined the AMCC, effective in the 2019-20 academic year.
 2020
 Two institutions left the AMCC at the end of the 2019–20 academic year. D'Youville began a transition to NCAA Division II as a new member of the East Coast Conference (ECC), and Franciscan, which was already a multi-sport associate member of the Presidents' Athletic Conference (PAC), became a full member of that league.
 Also at that time, men's volleyball associate Wittenberg left to return to its previous men's volleyball home of the Midwest Collegiate Volleyball League.
 Two schools became associate members effective in 2020–21—Saint Vincent added men's volleyball to its AMCC associate membership, while Wells College joined the AMCC as an associate member for men's and women's swimming & diving.
 2022
 Medaille left the AMCC at the end of the 2021–22 academic year to join the Empire 8 Athletic Conference (Empire 8).
 Wells added men's volleyball to its AMCC associate membership, effective with the 2023 spring season (2022–23 academic year).
 Two schools announced that they would join the AMCC in 2023–24. Carlow University will join after spending its first NCAA exploratory season in the NAIA's River States Conference, and Wells will become a full AMCC member.

Member schools

Current members
The AMCC currently has eight full members, with four being part of Pennsylvania's Commonwealth System of Higher Education, made up of state-supported but privately chartered institutions; one public institution; and three private institutions.

Notes

Future members

Associate members
The AMCC currently has six associate members:

Former members
The AMCC had four former full members:

Notes

Former associate members
The AMCC had two former associate members:

Notes

Membership timeline

Sports

The AMCC Conference sponsors championships in the following sports:

Men's sponsored sports by school

Men's varsity sports not sponsored by the AMCC that are played by AMCC schools

Women's sponsored sports by school

Women's varsity sports not sponsored by the AMCC that are played by AMCC schools

References

External links
 

 
Articles which contain graphical timelines